Main Aisi Kyun Houn is a Pakistani television drama mini series produced by "Anis Khan" under banner Eveready Pictures. The screenplay is written by "Irfan Mughal". The series started airing weekly on Express Entertainment on 8 February 2022.

The serial was criticized for its storyline over hair-shaming.

Plot
"Main Aisi Kyun Houn" is a story that celebrates the natural beauty of Pakistani women. Zara, a curly haired girl is belittled by her husband Aazar, who thinks she's ugly because of her hairs and he started having an extra-martial affair as he found a beautiful girl than Zara. On the other hand, Zara wants to join modelling however, she struggles in her married life and in achieving her dreams due to her hairs.

Cast
Noor Khan as Zara
Syed Jibran as Aazar
Noaman Sami as Rohail
Kaiser Khan Nizamani
Kinza Malik
Nida Khan as Saman
Emaan Khan as Anaya (Child star)
Adnan Sodhaa
Qaiser Riaz

References

External links
Main Aisi Kyun Houn at Express Entertainment

2022 Pakistani television series debuts
2022 Pakistani television series endings